Fred McCarthy may refer to:
Fred McCarthy (cartoonist) (1918–2009), American cartoonist
Fred McCarthy (footballer) (1890–?), English footballer
Frederick McCarthy (1881–1974), Canadian Olympic cyclist
Fred McCarthy (archaeologist) (1905–1997), Australian archaeologist and anthropologist